In Greek mythology, Sinon (Ancient Greek: Σίνων, from the verb "σίνομαι"—sinomai, "to harm, to hurt") or Sinopos, was a Greek warrior during the Trojan War.

Family 
Sinon was the son of Aesimus, son of Autolycus. He was the cousin of Odysseus through his mother Anticlea, daughter of Autolycus.

Mythology

Aeneid
In the Aeneid, Sinon pretended to have deserted the Greeks and, as a Trojan captive, told the Trojans that the giant wooden horse the Greeks had left behind was intended as a gift to the gods to ensure their safe voyage home. He told them that the horse was made too big for the Trojans to move it into their city, because if they did they would be invincible to later Achaean invasion. His story convinced the Trojans because it included the former details as well as an explanation that he was left behind to die by the doing of Odysseus, who was his enemy. The Trojans brought the Trojan Horse into their city against the advice of Cassandra (given the gift of prophecy by Apollo, but condemned to never be believed for not returning his love) and Laocoön (because two serpents came out of the water and strangled him and his sons, which the Trojans saw as a punishment for attacking the horse with a spear). Inside the giant wooden horse were Greek soldiers, who, as night fell, disembarked from the horse and opened the city gates, thus sealing the fate of Troy. He was also an Achaean spy who told the Greeks when the soldiers in the horse had begun their fight.

This scene is in neither the Iliad nor the Odyssey but is in the Aeneid; it is central to the perspective Virgil builds, in support of the actual Roman sentiment, of the Greeks as cunning, deceitful, and treacherous.

Posthomerica
In Quintus of Smyrna, the Trojans, ready to attack the Greek camp, see smoke coming from the Greek camp and cautiously approach. When they arrive at the  camp they find only Sinon alongside the Trojan Horse. The reader later finds out that it was Sinon who started the fire signal that drew the Trojans to the Greek camp. The rest of the camp is deserted. The Trojans circle him and gently ask him questions but when he does not answer they grow angry and begin to threaten to stab him. When he still does not answer, the Trojans cut off his ears and nose. Finally he tells them that the Greeks have fled and they built the Trojan Horse to honor Athena. Sinon claims that Odysseus wanted to sacrifice him but he managed to escape and hide in a marsh. When they gave up looking for him and left he returned to the Trojan Horse. Sinon claims that the Greeks stopped looking for him out of respect for Zeus. All the Trojans believe this story, except Laocoön who, along with his two sons, is promptly attacked by a giant sea serpent. Following this, believing that Laocoön was attacked because he offended the gods, the rest of the Trojans begin to believe Sinon's story. Feeling bad for Sinon, and fearing wrath from the gods, the Trojans bring Sinon and the Trojan Horse into Troy.

Sinon in other literature
In Dante Alighieri's Divine Comedy poem Inferno (Canto 30), Sinon is seen in the Tenth Bolgia of Hell's Circle of Fraud where, along with other Falsifiers of words, he is condemned to suffer a burning fever for all eternity. Sinon is here rather than the Evil Counselors Bolgia because his advice was false as well as evil.

The word "Sinonical" was coined by Lewes Lewknor in his 1595 work The Estate of English Fugitives.

William Shakespeare referred to Sinon on several occasions in his work, using him as a symbol of treachery.

References

External links 

 Apollodorus, The Library with an English Translation by Sir James George Frazer, F.B.A., F.R.S. in 2 Volumes, Cambridge, MA, Harvard University Press; London, William Heinemann Ltd. 1921. ISBN 0-674-99135-4. Online version at the Perseus Digital Library. Greek text available from the same website.
 Publius Vergilius Maro, Aeneid. Theodore C. Williams. trans. Boston. Houghton Mifflin Co. 1910. Online version at the Perseus Digital Library.
 Publius Vergilius Maro, Bucolics, Aeneid, and Georgics. J. B. Greenough. Boston. Ginn & Co. 1900. Latin text available at the Perseus Digital Library.

Characters in the Aeneid
Achaeans (Homer)
Corinthian characters in Greek mythology
Phocian characters in Greek mythology